Common Romanian, also known as Ancient Romanian, or Proto-Romanian, is a comparatively reconstructed Romance language evolved from Vulgar Latin and considered to have been spoken by the ancestors of today's Romanians, Aromanians, Megleno-Romanians, Istro-Romanians and related Balkan Latin peoples (Vlachs) between the 6th or 7th century AD and the 10th or 11th centuries AD. The evidence for this can be found in the fact that Romanian, Aromanian, Megleno-Romanian, and Istro-Romanian share with each other their main language innovations comparative to Vulgar Latin on one hand, and distinctive from the other Romance languages on the other, according to Romanian linguist Marius Sala.

History and development 

The Roman occupation led to a Roman-Thracian syncretism, and similar to the case of other conquered civilisations (see, for example, how Gallo-Roman culture developed in Roman Gaul) led to the Latinization of many Thracian tribes which were on the edge of the sphere of Latin influence, eventually resulting in the possible extinction of the Daco-Thracian language, but traces of it are still preserved in the Eastern Romance substratum. From the 2nd century AD, the Latin spoken in the Danubian provinces starts to display its own distinctive features, separate from the rest of the Romance languages, including those of western Balkans (Dalmatian). The Thraco-Roman period of the Romanian language is usually delimited between the 2nd century (or earlier via cultural influence and economic ties) and the 6th or the 7th century. It is divided, in turn, into two periods, with the division falling roughly in the 3rd to 4th century. The Romanian Academy considers the 5th century as the latest time that the differences between Balkan Latin and western Latin could have appeared, and that between the 5th and 8th centuries, the new language, Romanian, switched from Latin speech, to a vernacular Romance idiom, called .

In the 9th century, Proto-Romanian already had a structure very distinct from the other Romance languages, with major differences in grammar, morphology and phonology and already was a member of the Balkan language area.

In the tenth century or some time earlier Common Romanian split into two geographically separated groups. One was in the northern part of the Balkan peninsula (in a large  area between the Black Sea and the Adriatic Sea), from which the Daco-Romanian branch of Common Romanian subsequently formed. The other one was in the south of peninsula  (Dardania, Epirus, Macedonia, Thrace), where the Aromanian branch of Common Romanian presumably was spoken.

According to the theory, it evolved into the following modern languages and their dialects:
 Romanian language (sometimes called Daco-Romanian to distinguish it from the rest of the Eastern Romance languages)
 Aromanian (sometimes called Macedo-Romanian)
 Megleno-Romanian
 Istro-Romanian

Contact of Latin with Thraco-Dacian 

The language or languages spoken by the populations of the Southeastern Europe before the Roman expansion in the region are poorly attested and the relationship between them speculative, therefore linguists mainly use the phrase Thraco-Dacian when pointing the source of substratum words in Daco-Romance languages.

The nature of the contact between Latin and the substrate language(s) is considered to be similar to the contact with local languages in other parts incorporated in the Roman Empire resulting in a language shift to Latin and the number of lexical and morpho-syntactic elements retained from the substrate is relatively small despite some ongoing contact with languages closely related to the original substrate, Albanian for example.

To differentiate substratum words from borrowings linguists use a process of elimination compared to sieving by linguist Grigore Brâncuș, where after determining that the etymon doesn't belong to Latin and is not a loanword from a language of contact such as Old Church Slavonic, it is compared to Proto-Albanian words or reconstructed Proto-Indo-European words. Due to the poor attestation of the Thraco-Dacian language this comparative method has led to many words of uncertain or disputed origin to be erroneously classified as belonging to substratum in less academic circles.

Common features to the four dialects 

Collectively described as languages of the Daco-Romance subgroup from a synchronic, contemporary perspective Romanian, Aromanian, Megleno-Romanian, and Istro-Romanian are dialects of the same proto-language from a historical, diachronic point of view.

Of the features that are found in all four dialects, inherited from Latin or subsequently developed, of particular importance are:

 appearance of the ă vowel;
 growth of the plural inflectional ending -uri for the neuter gender;
 analytic present conditional (ex: Daco-Romanian aș cânta);
 analytic future with an auxiliary derived from Latin volo (ex: Aromanian va s-cãntu);
 enclisis of the definite article (ex. Istro-Romanian câre – cârele);
 nominal declension with two case forms in the singular feminine.
Comparatively, the dialects show a large number of loanwords from Slavic languages, including loanwords from Slavic languages spoken before the 9th century, at the stage before Aromanian, Daco-Romanian, and Megleno-Romanian separated. Of this words a few examples are:
 *bōrzdà (Aromanian: brazdã, Daco-Romanian: brazdă, Istro-Romanian: bråzda, Megleno-Romanian: brazdă);
 *nevěsta (Aromanian: niveastã, Daco-Romanian: nevastă, Istro-Romanian: nevęstę, Megleno-Romanian: niveastă);
 *sìto (Aromanian: sitã, Daco-Romanian: sită, Istro-Romanian: sitę, Megleno-Romanian: sită);
 *slàbъ (Aromanian: s(c)lab, Daco-Romanian: slab, Istro-Romanian: slåb, Megleno-Romanian: slab).

Substrate words are preserved at different levels in the four dialects. Daco-Romanian has 89, Aromanian 66. Megleno-Romanian 48, and Istro-Romanian 25. Example of elements found in the substrate:

 Aromanian: baciu, balig(ã), baltã, brãn, cãtun, cupaciu, gard, groapã, gushe, meturã,  mosh;

 Daco-Romanian: baci, baligă, baltă, brâu, cătun, copac, gard, groapă, gușă, mătură, moș;

 Istro-Romanian: båţe, bålege, båtę, brăv, catun, copåț, gård, gropę, guşę, meture, moș;

 Megleno-Romanian: baciu, balig, baltã, brǫn, cãtun, cupatš, gard, groapã, gușã, m'eturã, moș.

Development from Latin and reconstructed words 

Common Romanian inherited, like all other Romance languages, around 2000 words from Latin. The analysis of this words in comparison to Latin and between the four dialects allow us to determine the phonetic and grammatical features of the language.

Phonetics 

 higher frequency of usage of the open final syllable, for example bărbatu bunu;
 six vowel system – development of ă vowel;
 breaking of stressed open e into ie (*/je/);
 breaking of e and o to ea and oa before ă in the next syllable: Lat. feta> CRom. *feată;
 e and ea were kept unchanged after a labial consonant: Lat. pĭrum > CRom. *peru, Lat. pĭra > CRom. *peară (DRom. păr – pear tree, pară -pear);
 e and o before a nasal consonant were changed to i and u;
 usage of affricate consonants č,ğ,ț, and dz from iotation of c,g,t, and d : Lat. dico > CRom. *dzicu;
 usage of fricative post-alveolar consonant ș;
 usage of voiced palatals n', l''' from iotation of n and l : Lat. leporem > CRom. *l'epure;
 deletion of b and v when between vowels: Lat caballus > CRom. *calu;
 group consonants cl and gl (only in words inherited from Latin) were pronounced with soft l': Lat. clavis  > CRom. *cl'aie (key);
 rhotacism of intervocalic l: Lat. pilus  > CRom. *peru;
 deletion of ll followed by unstresses a: Lat. stella > CRom. *stea;
 labiovelars qu, gu followed by a changed to labials p, b: Lat. aqua > CRom. *apă;
 labialization of velar c from cs and ct to ps and pt: Lat. frixit > CRom. *fripse;
 gn consonant group changed to mn: Lat. lignus > CRom. *lemnu;
 intervocalic br and bl changed to ur and ul: Lat. stabulum > CRom. *staul;
 st ans sc followed by e or i became șt, șc: Lat. crescere > CRom. *creștere.

 Grammar 

 retention of plural desinences -a to -e and -ora to -uri, -ure from Latin in the neutral gender, which is re-organized with masculine forms at singular and feminine at plural;
 reduction or disappearance of 4th and 5th declension. Common Romanian had 3 declensions, remnants of the 4th and the 5th declensions existed for example noru (cloud), dzi (day) respectively;
 case system reduced to Nominative-Accusative, Dative-Genitive and Vocative;
 enclitic definite article;
 the process of composing the numerals between 10 and 20 and the use of și conjunction between multiple of 10 and cardinal numbers;
 stressed-unstressed forms for personal pronouns in Accusative and Dative;

 First sample of Common Romanian text 

Referring to this time period, of great debate and interest is the so-called  episode. In Theophylactus Simocatta Histories, ( 630), the author mentions the words . The context of this mention is a Byzantine expedition during Maurice's Balkan campaigns in 587, led by general Comentiolus, in the Haemus, against the Avars. The success of the campaign was compromised by an incident: during a night march:

Nearly two centuries after Theophylactus, the same episode is retold by another Byzantine chronicler, Theophanes Confessor, in his Chronographia ( 810–814). He mentions the words  [; "turn, turn brother"]:

The first to identify the excerpts as examples of early Romanian was Johann Thunmann in 1774. Since then, a debate among scholars had been going on to identify whether the language in question is a sample of early Romanian, or just a Byzantine command  (of Latin origin, as it appears as such–torna''–in Emperors Mauricius Strategikon), and with  used as a colloquial form of address between the Byzantine soldiers.

An important contribution to the debate was Nicolae Iorga's first noticing in 1905 of the duality of the term  in Theophylactus text: the shouting to get the attention of the master of the animal (in the language of the country), and the misunderstanding of this by the bulk of the army as a military command (due to the resemblance with the Latin military command).  Iorga considers the army to have been composed of both auxiliary Romanised Thracians—speaking  (the “language of the country”/“language of their parents/of the natives”) —and of Byzantines (a mélange of ethnicities using Byzantine words of Latin origin as official command terms, as attested in the Strategikon).

This view was later supported by the Greek historian A. Keramopoulos (1939), as well as by Alexandru Philippide (1925), who considered that the word  should not be understood as a solely military command term, because it was, as supported by chronicles, a word “of the country”, as by the year 600, the bulk of the Byzantine army was raised from barbarian mercenaries and the Romanic population of the Balkan Peninsula.

Starting from the second half of the 20th century, many Romanian scholars consider it a sample of early Romanian language, a view with supporters such as Al. Rosetti (1960), Petre Ș. Năsturel (1956) and I. Glodariu (1964).

In regards to the Latin term  (an imperative form of the verb torno), in modern Romanian, the corresponding or descendant term  now means "pour" (a conjugated form of the verb  – "to pour"). However, in older or early Romanian, the verb also had the sense of "to return or come back", and this sense is also still preserved in the modern Aromanian verb .

See also 
 Eastern Romance languages
 Daco-Roman
 Thraco-Roman
 History of Romanian
 Romanian language
 Albanian–Romanian linguistic relationship

Notes 

Eastern Romance languages
Romanian
Languages attested from the 6th century